Iraak is a locality in Victoria, Australia, located approximately 35 km south-east of Mildura, Victoria.

Iraak and nearby localities Nangiloc and Colignan were established as soldier settlement farming areas after World War I, road access to the area being from the west via Boonoonar on what is now the Calder Highway.  
The Post Office opened on 22 September 1922 the same day as that of Nangiloc, closing in 1960.

The Karadoc Solar Farm opened in the locality of Iraak in late 2018.

See also
 1956 Murray River flood

References

Towns in Victoria (Australia)
Populated places on the Murray River
Mallee (Victoria)
Australian soldier settlements
1922 establishments in Australia